The Daily Planet is a fictional newspaper in the Superman comic series.

Daily Planet may also refer to:

Publications
 Daily Planet (Philadelphia newspaper)
 Berkeley Daily Planet, a newspaper in Berkeley, California
 Twin Cities Daily Planet, an online news source based in the Twin Cities metropolitan area of Minnesota, U.S.
 Asheville Daily Planet, a newspaper in Asheville, North Carolina
 Telluride Daily Planet, a newspaper in Telluride, Colorado

Other uses
 Daily Planet (DC Comics house advertisement), a promotional page appearing in DC Comics publications from 1976 to 1981
 Daily Planet (TV series), a Canadian science television program
 Daily Planet (brothel), an Australian brothel
 "Daily Planet", a song by Love from Forever Changes
 SECU Daily Planet, part of the North Carolina Museum of Natural Sciences